Bhrigu was a rishi in Hinduism. He was one of the seven great sages, the Saptarshis, one of the many Prajapatis (the facilitators of Creation) created by Brahma.  The first compiler of predictive astrology, and also the author of Bhrigu Samhita, the astrological (Jyotish) classic, Bhrigu is considered a Manasa Putra ("mind-born-son") of Brahma. The adjectival form of the name, Bhargava, is used to refer to the descendants and the school of Bhrigu. According to Manusmriti, Bhrigu was a compatriot of and lived during the time of Manu, the Hindu progenitor of humanity. Bhrigu had his Ashram (Hermitage) on the Vadhusar River, a tributary of the Drishadwati River near Dhosi Hill in the Vedic state of Brahmavarta, presently on the border of Haryana and Rajasthan in India. Along with Manu, Bhrigu had made important contributions to Manusmriti, which was constituted out of a sermon to a congregation of saints in the state of Brahmavarta, after the great floods in this area. 
As per Skanda Purana, Bhrigu migrated to Bhrigukutch, modern Bharuch on the banks of the Narmada river in Gujarat, leaving his son Chyavana at Dhosi Hill.

He was married to Khyati, one of the nine daughters of Prajapati Kardama. She is more popularly known as the Daughter of Prajapati Daksha.
She was the mother of Devi Lakshmi as Bhargavi.  They also had two sons named Dhata and Vidhata. He had one more son with Kavyamata (Usana), who is better known than Bhrigu himself – Shukra, learned sage and guru of the asuras. The sage Chyavana is also said to be his son with Puloma, as is the folk hero Mrikanda. [Maha:1.5] One of his descendants was sage Jamadagni, who in turn was the father of sage Parashurama, considered an avatar of Vishnu.

Legends
Bhrigu is mentioned in Shiva Purana and Vayu Purana, where he is shown present during the great yajna of Daksha Prajapati (his father-in-law). He supports the continuation of the Daksha yajna even after being warned that without an offering for Shiva, it was asking for a catastrophe for everyone present there. In Tattiriya Upanishad, he had a conversation with his father Varuni on Brahman.

In the Bhagavad Gītā, Krishna says that among sages, Bhrigu is representative of the opulence of God.

Patience test of Trimurti 
Many great sages gathered at the bank of the river Sarasvati to participate in Maha Yagya. All the great saints and sages could not decide that out of the trinity of gods, Vishnu, Brahma, and Shiva who was pre-eminent and to whom they should offer the Pradhanta (Master) of that Yagya. With the consent of all the great saints presents there, it was decided that Bhrigu would test and decide who was pre-eminent.

Upon being entrusted with the task, Maharishi Bhrigu decided to test each of the Trimurti. He first visited Brahma, who was reciting the Vedas and spending time with his consort, Saraswati, and, therefore, ignored the arrival of Bhrigu. Bhrigu got angry and started to insult his father. Brahma also got angry and, in fear, Bhrigu left for Kailash (home of Shiva). Lord Shiva meanwhile was also talking with Parvati. Shiva was infuriated, but was calmed by his consort, Parvati. The sage then ran to Vaikuntha. 

Now, the only remaining deva was Vishnu, and, to make things even worse, Vishnu wasn't able to see Bhrigu, because he was asleep on his Sheshanaga. Bhrigu kicked Vishnu on the chest to wake him up, as he was enraged by the fact that Vishnu was constantly asleep on the Shesha. Vishnu woke up, greeted Bhrigu,  and starting massaging his feet, asking him if he had hurt his feet in kicking his chest. In the process, Vishnu destroyed the third eye of Bhrigu that was on his feet, symbolizing his ignorance and ego, and, as soon as it was destroyed, he grew aware of his egotistical outbursts with extreme pain. He begged forgiveness of Vishnu, who readily forgave him. He then declared Vishnu the greatest among the Trimurti, the triumvirate of gods. Vishnu's consort Lakshmi grew angry at Vishnu because the chest was considered as Lakshmi's place (vakshasthala) and fled Vishnu to be born on earth as Bhargavi.

Tirupati story
A similar story is found in the story of Tirupati. But this time Bhrigu curses Brahma to not be worshipped, Shiva to be worshipped as the lingam, and an angered Lakshmi, cursing the Brahmins, to achieve wealth only by hard work.

Bhrigu and Places 
Bhrigu's Ashram 'Deepotsaka' was located at the base of Dhosi Hill in present-day village Dhosi on the border of Narnaul district in Haryana and Jhunjhunu district of Rajasthan, from where he migrated to Bharuch. His son Chyavana, known for Chyavanprash also had his Ashram at Dhosi Hill. Bhrigu is also worshipped at Bharuch, Swamimalai, Tirumala, Ballia, Nanguneri, Thiruneermalai, Mannargudi.
An Ashram for Bhrigu is in Maruderi, Kanchipuram district in Tamil Nadu. Khedbrahma in Gujarat is associated with Brahma and Bhrigu's legend of testing Trinity. Lastly, Bhrigu migrated to Bhuinj Satara, Maharashtra where he took Samadhi. His ashram and his daughter's Laxmi's temple also situated there. His sons Chyavan's ashram and samadhi are also situated on Chyavaneshwar hill near Bhuinj.

Upanishads 
In Taittriya Upanishad first six anuvakas of Bhrigu Valli are called Bhargavi Varuni Vidya, which means "the knowledge Bhrigu got from (his father) Varuni". It is in these anuvakas that sage Varuni advises Bhrigu with one of the oft-cited definition of Brahman, as "that from which beings originate, through which they live, and in which they re-enter after death, explore that because that is Brahman". This thematic, all encompassing, eternal nature of reality and existence develops as the basis for Bhrigu's emphasis on introspection and inwardization, to help peel off the outer husks of knowledge, in order to reach and realize the innermost kernel of spiritual self-knowledge.

Bhrigu Samhita 
Bhrigu decided to write his famous books of astrology, the Bhrigu Samhita. Maharishi Bhrigu collected birth charts, wrote full-life predictions and compiled them together as Bhrigu Samhita. Bhrigu Samhita is believed to be one of the first book of its kind in the field of astrology.

References

Sources
 

Rishis
Prajapatis
Hindu astrologers